Gonzalo Jiménez Corral (30 June 1902 – 27 August 1992) was a Spanish water polo player. He competed in the 1928 Summer Olympics, and was also part of the Spanish team in the 1928 tournament. He played in the only match for Spain as a goalkeeper.

See also
 Spain men's Olympic water polo team records and statistics
 List of men's Olympic water polo tournament goalkeepers

References

External links
 

1902 births
1992 deaths
Spanish male water polo players
Water polo goalkeepers
Olympic water polo players of Spain
Water polo players at the 1928 Summer Olympics
20th-century Spanish people